The Rt. Rev.  Percy Stevens  was a missionary of the Anglican Church. Born on 21 May 1882  and educated at Winchester House, Bristol and St Aidan's Theological College, Birkenhead, he was ordained in 1907 and began his ecclesiastical career as a Curate at St Jude's, Plymouth. For many years a CMS Missionary in Kwangsi-Hunan he was Bishop of that area from  1933 to 1949. He died on 7 July 1966

Notes

1882 births
Anglican missionary bishops in China
1966 deaths
Alumni of St Aidans College Birkenhead
20th-century Anglican bishops in China
Anglican bishops of Kwangsi-Hunan